Easton is an inner city area of the city of Bristol in the United Kingdom. Informally the area is considered to stretch east of Bristol city centre and the M32 motorway,  centred on Lawrence Hill. Its southern and eastern borders are less defined, merging into St Philip's Marsh and Eastville. The area includes the Lawrence Hill and Barton Hill estates.

In administrative terms, Easton comprises the electoral wards of Easton and part of Lawrence Hill. It is located within the Bristol West constituency. The electoral ward of Easton includes parts of the localities of Netham and Whitehall, and a large part of Greenbank. The Bristol & Bath Railway Path passes through the ward.

History
In the medieval period Easton lay within the Royal Forest of Kingswood in the manor of Barton Regis. The name Easton is probably derived from the Anglo-Saxon East Tun meaning East Farm. The earliest documentary reference to Easton is Chester and Master's 1610 Map of Kingswood, which depicts three settlements: Upper Easton, which was centered on Easton Road, Lower Easton, which was  centered on St Marks Road, and Baptist Mills, on the east bank of the River Frome.

In the post-medieval period the area became increasingly industrial with large scale extraction of coal, clay and sand occurring across the area. In the 19th century most of Easton was developed for housing.

In the late 1960s and 70s large areas of Easton were demolished to make way for new roads (A4320 Easton Way and the M32 Motorway) and housing estates.

During the 1990s UK crack cocaine and opioid epidemic, Easton was heavily hit with drugs. Drug gangs ran the streets of Easton throughout the 1990s and 2000s. There were several shootings in the area between another drug gang in St. Paul's, the two gangs turf were only divided the A4320 Easton Way and M32 Motoway. Gangs in Easton were still strong and violence still continued into the 2010s, by the early 2020s gang violence has drastically reduced and anti-social behaviour is on the decline. Parts of Easton have seen extremely high house price increases over the last decade.

Demographics

The Census 2011 reported that Easton has a higher proportion of under 10s and people in the 25-44 age group than the England and Wales average, but fewer 10 to 15 year olds and people aged over 45.

Easton is one of the most deprived areas in the south west of England, with the Lawrence Hill ward the most deprived ward in the region and one of the most deprived in Britain. This has resulted in the area being granted European Union objective 2 status and 'New Deal for Communities' status by the UK government which is only granted to the most underprivileged urban wards.

St Marks Road is a shopping street noted for the exuberant sculpted signs that hang above many of the shop doors, and the architecturally striking illuminated dome of Easton Mosque. There are a number of Moroccan and Indian subcontinent restaurants and shops specialising in organic and ethnic foods.

Banksy

Banksy lived in Easton in the 1990s. There are several of his artworks in the area, although the council inadvertently painted over one and another has had a tin of paint thrown over it. This was possibly done in response to the house that the art was attached to being sold as a piece of Banksy graffiti with a house thrown in for free.

Sport 
The area is home to Easton Leisure Centre.

Transport 
Easton has two railway stations, Lawrence Hill and Stapleton Road, which are served by trains on the Severn Beach Line plus services to and from Gloucester and South Wales. The main line to South Wales, the Midlands, Scotland and London also passes through Lawrence Hill and Stapleton Road; after which the Severn Beach line branches off just north of. The M32 motorway marks the border of Easton to the north. The A4032 dual carriageway cuts the area in two.

References

External links

 Easton Ward map, Bristol City Council, May 2016
 Public houses in Easton
 Living Easton

Areas of Bristol
Wards of Bristol